This is a list of philosophical organizations and societies.

 Academia Analitica
 American Association of Philosophy Teachers
 American Catholic Philosophical Association
 American Ethical Union
 American Philosophical Association
 American Philosophical Society
 American Society for Aesthetics
 American Society for Political and Legal Philosophy
 Animal Rights Cambridge
 Arché (research center)
 Aristotelian Society
 Association for Logic, Language and Information
 Association for Symbolic Logic
 Association for the Scientific Study of Consciousness
 Australasian Association of Philosophy
 Batavian Society for Experimental Philosophy
 British Philosophical Association
 British Society for Ethical Theory
 British Society of Aesthetics
 Café Philosophique
 Cambridge Philosophical Society
 Canadian House of Commons Standing Committee on Access to Information, Privacy and Ethics
 Canadian Philosophical Association
 Canadian Society for History and Philosophy of Mathematics
 Carnegie Council for Ethics in International Affairs
 Center for Ethics at Yeshiva University
 Center for Religion, Ethics and Social Policy
 Center for the Study of Ethics in the Professions
 Centre de Recherche en Epistémologie Appliquée
 Centre for Applied Ethics
 Centre for Applied Philosophy and Public Ethics (CAPPE)
 Centre for History and Philosophy of Science, University of Leeds
 Charity International
 Citizens for Responsibility and Ethics in Washington
 Commission on Federal Ethics Law Reform
 Committee on Publication Ethics
 Computer Ethics Institute
 Concerned Philosophers for Peace
 Conscious enterprise
 CPNSS
 Cumberland School of Law's Center for Biotechnology, Law, and Ethics
 District of Columbia Board of Elections and Ethics
 Ethics & Religious Liberty Commission
 Ethics and Democracy Network
 Ethics and Excellence in Journalism Foundation
 Ethics and Public Policy Center
 Ethics Commission
 Ethics Committee (European Union)
 Ethics Resource Center
 European Society for Analytic Philosophy
 European Society for Philosophy and Psychology
 Federal Ethics Committee on Non-Human Biotechnology
 Foundation for Thought and Ethics
 Hegel Society of America
 Hegel Society of Great Britain
 Houston Philosophical Society
 Human Genetics Commission
 Institute for Ethics and Emerging Technologies
 Institute for Global Ethics
 Institute for Science, Ethics and Innovation
 Institutional review board
 International Association for Business and Society
 International Association for Computing and Philosophy
 International Association for Environmental Philosophy
 International Association for Philosophy and Literature
 International Association for Philosophy of Law and Social Philosophy
 International Association of Empirical Aesthetics
 International Bioethics Committee
 International Federation of Philosophical Societies
 International Humanist and Ethical Union
 International Society for Environmental Ethics
 International Society for Philosophy of Music Education
 International Society for the History of Philosophy of Science
 International Society for the History of Rhetoric
 Jeffersonville Ethics Commission
 John Dewey Society
 John Stuart Mill Institute
 Karl Jaspers Society of North America
 Kenan Institute for Ethics
 Kennedy Institute of Ethics
 Kurt Gödel Society
 Literary and Philosophical Society of Newcastle upon Tyne
 Maguire Center for Ethics
 Manchester Literary and Philosophical Society
 Markkula Center for Applied Ethics
 Melbourne School of Continental Philosophy
 Metaphysical Society
 Metaphysical Society of America
 National Commission for the Protection of Human Subjects of Biomedical and Behavioral Research
 Nevada Commission on Ethics
 Oklahoma Ethics Commission
 Pennsylvania State Ethics Commission
 Phi Sigma Tau
 Philomatic society
 Philosophy Documentation Center
 Philosophy of Science Association
 Philosophy Sharing Foundation
 Presidential Commission for the Study of Bioethical Issues
 Royal Institute of Philosophy
 Royal Institution of South Wales
 Royal Philosophical Society of Glasgow
 Saturday Club (Boston, Massachusetts)
 School for Ethics and Global Leadership
 Semiotic Society of America
 Shalom Hartman Institute
 Society for Applied Philosophy
 Society for Business Ethics
 Society for Ethics and Philosophy
 Society for Phenomenology and Existential Philosophy
 Society for Philosophical Inquiry
 Society for Philosophy and Psychology
 Society of Christian Philosophers
 Socrates Cafe
 St James Ethics Centre
 Swiss Center for Affective Sciences
 Telos Institute
 Tennessee Philosophical Association
 Texas Ethics Commission
 The British Society for the Philosophy of Religion
 The Internationale Hegel-Gesellschaft
 The Internationale Hegel-Vereinigung
 The Metaphysical Club
 The Philosophical Society of England
 Thomas-Institut
 United States House Committee on Standards of Official Conduct
 United States Office of Government Ethics
 United States Senate Select Committee on Ethics
 University Philosophical Society (Trinity College, Dublin)
 Van Leer Jerusalem Institute
 VERITAS/ philosophy students
 Wesleyan Philosophical Society
 York virtuosi
 Yorkshire Philosophical Society

 
Organizations